Mahidharapura Dynasty (Khmer: រាជត្រកូលមហិធរៈបុរៈ ; Thai: ราชวงศ์มหิธรปุระ ; Roman: House of Mahidharapura, Mahidra pura) Family of Mahidharpura, some sources call Mahitarapura dynasty or Khom royal family. The Mahidharapura dynasty of the Varman dynasty was established by Hiranyavarman and was known after the accession of Jayavarman VI in 1080. Its ancestor was Hiranyavarman of the royal family ruling Bhimapura.

Family Tree

References

Cambodian monarchs
Khmer Empire
Cambodian